Ticușu is a commune in Brașov County, Transylvania, Romania. It is composed of two villages, Cobor (Kiwern; Kóbor) and Ticușu Vechi (the commune center).

It borders the following communes:  Comăna to the east; Ungra to the northeast; Jibert to the north and west; and Mândra, Șercaia, and Șoarș to the south.

At the 2011 census, 65.7% of inhabitants were Romanians, 20.4% Roma and 12.6% Hungarians.

References

Communes in Brașov County
Localities in Transylvania